Daniel Heartz (1928–2019) was an American musicologist and professor emeritus of music at the University of California, Berkeley.

Heartz studied at Harvard University. He lived in Berkeley, California.

Honors 
 Recipient of Guggenheim Fellowships
 ASCAP–Deems Taylor Awards
 Kinkeldey Award of the American Musicological Society.

Selected bibliography 
 Artists and Musicians: Portrait Studies from the Rococo to the Revolution, with contributing studies by Paul Corneilson and John A. Rice, ed. Beverly Wilcox, Ann Arbor, MI: Steglein, 2014. 
 From Garrick to Gluck: Essays on Opera in the Age of Enlightenment, ed. John A. Rice, Hillsdale, NY: Pendragon Press, 2004. 
 Haydn, Mozart and the Viennese School. 1740-1780, New York, W. W. Norton, 1995.  
 Mozart, Haydn and Early Beethoven. 1781–1802, New York, W. W. Norton, 2008.  
 Mozart. Idomeneo (Neue Ausgabe sämtlicher Werke ii/5/11), Kassel, 1972.
 Mozart's Operas, Berkeley: University of California Press, 1990.  
 Music in European Capitals. The Galant Style, 1720–1780,  New York: W.W. Norton, 2003. 
 Pierre Attaingnant. Royal Printer of Music, Berkeley: University of California Press, 1969.

References 

American musicologists
Mozart scholars
1928 births
2019 deaths
People from Exeter, New Hampshire
Harvard University alumni